Lysias Anicetus (epithet means "the Invincible") was an Indo-Greek king.

Time of reign
According to numismatist Bopearachchi, Lysias was a close successor to Menander I and Zoilos I, and therefore may have ruled around 130–120 BCE. R. C. Senior suggests a similar date.

Bopearachchi suggests that Lysias' territory covered the areas of the Paropamisade and Arachosia, but his coins have been found in the Punjab and it is possible that Lysias ruled most of the Indo-Greek territory for a period, though perhaps in cooperation with Antialcidas, with whom he shared most of his monograms.

Lysias apparently claimed to be a descendant of Demetrius, using a similar reverse of Heracles crowning himself, Demetrius' epithet Invincible, and sometimes the elephant crown always worn by this king. A similar reverse was also used by Zoilus I, who may have ruled some decades earlier and was likely an enemy of Menander.

Lysias' rule seems to have begun after the murder of Menander's infant son Thrason, and since his coins do not resemble Menander's it seems as though he, just as Zoilus, belonged to a competing line. Despite his magnificent coinage, his policies were probably rather defensive. The Bactrian kingdom had recently fallen to invading nomads and though the Indo-Greeks managed to avoid the same fate, they became isolated from the Hellenistic world.

Coin types

Lysias issued a number of bilingual Indian coins. On his silver portrait types he appears either diademed or dressed in various types of headgear worn by earlier kings: the elephant scalp of Demetrios I, a bull's horns helmet or Corinthian helmet with scales, and the Greek flat hat "kausia". He also appeared throwing a spear.

The reverse is always Herakles crowning himself, and holding his club, with the new addition of a palm to signify victory.

He also issued a series of Attic tetradrachms, and even smaller denominations (a hemidrachm is known) for circulation in Bactria.

His Indian type square bronzes show a bust of Herakles/elephant.

"Mule coins" (overstrikes)
There is a bronze which features the obverse of Lysias and the reverse of Antialcidas. This was interpreted by Tarn and other earlier scholars as though the two kings might have forged some kind of alliance, but later, a bronze with the opposite arrangement was found.

The modern view is that these coins were "mules"--in other words, an improperly overstruck issue of one of the pertinent rulers. While not signs of an alliance, they still suggest that Lysias' and Antialcidas' reigns were adjacent.

See also
 Indo-Greek Kingdom
 Greco-Buddhism
 Indo-Scythians

References
 The Greeks in Bactria and India, W. W. Tarn, Cambridge University Press

External links
Coins of Lysias
More coins of Lysias
Catalog of the coins of Lysias

Indo-Greek kings
2nd-century BC rulers in Asia